The Chimayó cocktail was created by Arturo Jaramillo, owner of the Rancho de Chimayó restaurant in Chimayó, New Mexico in 1965, the Chimayó cocktail is a tequila and apple cider based drink. Legend has it that Jaramillo was looking for a use for the apples that are plentiful in the Chimayó valley when he developed this signature drink of his restaurant.

Preparation and serving
The Chimayó cocktail is created by mixing 1½ oz tequila with 1 oz unfiltered apple cider, 1/4 oz fresh lemon juice and 1/4 oz creme de cassis over ice.  According to Eric Felten, a James Beard Award recipient for Newspaper Writing on Spirits, Wine and Beer, the "touch of casis...gives the drink a pleasant, pale purplish hue and the sweetness needed to balance the tart lemon taste."

Nomenclature
Cider, in this article, is used in the North American sense to mean a non-alcoholic apple cider, not the alcoholic hard cider.

See also
 List of cocktails

References
 How's Your Drink? Cocktails, Culture, and the Art of Drinking by Eric Felten, Surrey Books 1997
 Food of Santa Fe International

Cocktails with tequila
Cocktails with fruit juice
Cocktails with lemon juice
Cocktails with liqueur
Sweet cocktails
Sour cocktails
Mexican cuisine